Ghassan is an Arabic given name, the name of the founder of the Christian Ghassan dynasty (Ghassanids). It is used among Muslims, Christians, and Druze. Notable people with the name include:

Ghassan Achi (born 1993), Lebanese skier
Ghassan Alian (born 1972), Israeli commander of the IDF Golani Brigade
Ghassan Afiouni (born 1972), Lebanese scientist
Ghassan Andoni (born 1956), Palestinian Christian physicist and peace activist
Ghassan Ashqar (born 1937), Lebanese politician
Ghassan Ben Jeddou, Tunisian/Lebanese journalist
Ghassan Elashi, Palestinian American imprisoned political/charitable activist
Ghassan Hage (born 1957), Lebanese/Australian anthropologist and social theorist
Ghassan Ibrahim (born 1977), Syrian journalist
Ghassan Rahbani (born 1964), Lebanese producer, songwriter and composer
Ghassan Salhab (born 1958), Lebanese screenwriter, film director, and producer
Ghassan al-Sharbi (born 1974), Saudi held in Guantanamo Bay
Ghassan Kanafani (1936–1972), assassinated Palestinian poet and writer
Ghassan Khatib (born 1954), Palestinian politician
Ghassan Massoud (born 1958), Syrian actor and filmmaker
Ghassan Muhsen (born 1945), Iraqi diplomat
Ghassan Shabaneh, Arab-American political academic
Ghassan Shakaa (born 1943), Palestinian politician
Ghassan Tueni (1926–2012), Lebanese diplomat and journalist
Ghassan Saliba (born 1956), Lebanese musical artist
Ghassan al-Zamel (born 1963), Syrian politician

Arabic masculine given names